The Fire Hall in Joliet, Montana, located on its Main Street and also known as City Hall, was built in 1910.  It was listed on the National Register of Historic Places in 1986.

It is a one-story frame structure.  It was built behind the Rock Creek State Bank on Carbon Avenue. The building included a space for equipment, a bedroom, and a bell and hose tower.

It was moved to its current location in the 1940s to serve as the Town of Joliet's city hall and was still in use for that purpose in 1985.

References

Fire stations on the National Register of Historic Places in Montana
City and town halls on the National Register of Historic Places in Montana
National Register of Historic Places in Carbon County, Montana
Buildings and structures completed in 1910
1910 establishments in Montana